The All-Australian team is an all-star team of Australian rules footballers, selected by a panel at the end of each season. It represents a complete team, including an interchange bench, of the best-performed players during the season, led by that season's premiership coach.

Despite its nature, the All-Australian team is only ceremonial. Though the AFL played an All-Star match in 2020, it was the first in 12 years, and the difference in skill level between the All-Australian team and the nearest international competitor is currently too large for any contest to be competitive. Despite this, some of these players have represented Australia in AFL Academy junior teams up to the age of 18, as more than two-thirds of all AFL Academy representatives have gone on to play at senior AFL level.

From 1998 to 2004, the Australian international rules team was mainly composed of All-Australians, and from 2005 to 2013 the team for the annual International Rules Series was selected according to the quite different requirements of International rules football.

This change was reverted ahead of the 2014 series, with any player who had been selected at least once in any All-Australian team being eligible for selection.

History 
The earliest concept considered to be a precursor to the All-Australian team was an annual team selected by Sporting Life magazine between 1947 and 1955. A panel of sportswriters at the magazine selected a full team of eighteen from all ANFC-affiliated competitions. For a time, AFL historians considered these teams to be official All-Australian teams, but no longer recognises them as such.

The first official All-Australian team was selected in 1953, immediately after the Australian Football Carnival, which was held in Adelaide on that occasion. Based solely upon performances at the carnival, the All-Australian team was selected by representatives of the various state teams. This tradition continued at all subsequent interstate carnivals until 1988.

In 1991, following the VFL's conversion to a national competition and its renaming as the Australian Football League (AFL), an annual All-Australian team based on performances during the AFL premiership season was introduced.

Since 1999, the All-Australian coach is the coach of the premiership-winning side that year.

Prior to 2007, only the final selections in the All-Australian team were announced. Since 2007, the All-Australian selection committee has nominated the 40 leading players of the year in their playing positions at the conclusion of the home and away season, before announcing the final 22 at a later date during the All-Australian Presentation Dinner. The squad was increased to 44 in 2022. The current All-Australian selection panel consists of chairman Gillon McLachlan, Kane Cornes, Glen Jakovich, Chris Johnson, Cameron Ling, Brad Scott, Gerard Healy, Nick Riewoldt, Jude Bolton, and Andrew Dillon.

In addition to the senior All-Australian team, each year an All-Australian is announced based on the AFL National Under 18 Championships and the AFL National Under 16 Championships.

The following lists are for senior teams only.

Teams

AFL era: 1991–present

2022

2021

2020

2019

2018

2017

2016

2015

2014

Notes:
 Despite winning the Brownlow Medal, Matt Priddis was not selected in the team, but was selected in the initial squad of 40 like Sam Mitchell and Jack Riewoldt were two years earlier.

2013

 •Despite winning the Coleman Medal, Jarryd Roughead was not named at full forward, the position he played all season.

2012

Notes:''
 Despite being awarded the Brownlow Medal retrospectively alongside Trent Cotchin over four years later in November 2016, Sam Mitchell was not selected in the team, but was selected in the initial squad of 40. 
 Despite winning the Coleman Medal, Jack Riewoldt was also not selected in the team, but was selected in the initial squad of 40 as well.

2011

2010

2009

2008

2007Notes: For the first occasion, a preliminary squad of 40 was announced.

2006

2005

2004

2003

2002

2001

2000Notes: Despite winning the Brownlow Medal and club best and fairest in a grand final year, Shane Woewodin was not selected in the team. Notably three Adelaide midfielders were selected despite that club missing the finals with a 9-13 win-loss record.

1999Notes: Despite winning the Coleman Medal, Scott Cummings was not selected in the team.

1998Notes:1998 was the final season in which the coach of the All-Australian team was not necessarily the premiership coach.

1997

1996

1995

1994

1993

1992

1991Notes:'''
 Despite winning that season's Grand Final, Hawthorn did not supply one player in the team of the year.

VFL Team of the Year: 1982–1990
The AFL website recognizes players who were named in the VFL Team of the Year from 1982 to 1990 as having All-Australian status. This was a team picked by Victorian selectors.

Australian Football Carnival era: 1953–1988
State of origin era

1988

1987

1986

1985

1983

1980

1979

Pre-State of Origin era

1972

1969

1966

1961

1958

1956

1953

Sporting Life Team of the Year: 1947–1955

These teams were once considered to be equivalent to All-Australian selection, but are no longer recognised as such.

1955

1954

1953

1952

1951

1950

1949

1948

1947

Records

Most times selected overall
Qualification: Selection in seven or more teams from 1953 to 2020.
 8 – Gary Ablett Jr. | 2007, 2008, 2009, 2010, 2011, 2012, 2013, 2014
 8 – Patrick Dangerfield | 2012, 2013, 2015, 2016, 2017, 2018, 2019, 2020
 8 – Lance Franklin | 2008, 2010, 2011, 2012, 2014, 2016, 2017, 2018
 8 – Robert Harvey | 1992, 1994, 1995, 1996, 1997, 1998, 1999, 2003
 8 – Mark Ricciuto | 1994, 1997, 1998, 2000, 2002, 2003, 2004, 2005
 7 – Craig Bradley | 1983, 1985, 1986, 1993, 1994, 1995, 1997
 7 – Nathan Buckley | 1996, 1997, 1998, 1999, 2000, 2001, 2003
 7 – Wayne Carey | 1993, 1994, 1995, 1996, 1998, 1999, 2000
 7 – Paul Roos | 1985, 1987, 1988, 1991, 1992, 1996, 1997

Most times selected in Carnivals era
Qualification: Selection in three or more teams from 1953 to 1980 and 1988.
 4 – Jack Clarke (Western Australia / East Fremantle) | 1953, 1956, 1958, 1961
 3 – John Abley (South Australia / Port Adelaide) | 1956, 1958, 1961
 3 – Ron Barassi (Victoria / Melbourne) | 1956, 1958, 1961
 3 – Jack Clarke (Victoria / Essendon) | 1953, 1956, 1958
 3 – Graham Farmer (Western Australia / East Perth) | 1956, 1958, 1961
 3 – Ted Whitten (Victoria / Footscray) | 1956, 1958, 1961

See also

AFL Women's All-Australian team

References

External links
 All-Australian Team on official AFL website
 Sporting Life Teams 1947–1955: fullpointsfooty.net
 All-Australian Teams 1953–1988: fullpointsfooty.net
 All-Australian Teams 1991–2004: Official AFL website

Australian Football League awards
Australian rules football awards
National Australian rules football teams
Men's national sports teams of Australia